Superstar Hair Challenge is a reality TV show on Slice Network hosted by Karen Bertelsen. Contestants must complete hair design related challenges, and a person is executed each week.

External links
Website

See also

2000s Canadian game shows
Slice (TV channel) original programming